The 2021 Cyprus T20I Cup was a Twenty20 International (T20I) cricket tournament that took place in Cyprus in October 2021. The participating teams were the hosts Cyprus along with Estonia and Isle of Man. On 5 October, Cyprus and Estonia played a two-match bilateral series, which were the first official T20I matches for both sides, before the tri-nation Cyprus T20I Cup began on 6 October. The venue for the matches was the Happy Valley Ground in Episkopi, within the Cypriot district of Limassol.

Cyprus defeated Estonia 2–0 in their bilateral series, before the Isle of Man won the tri-nation tournament with a 100% record. Individual awards were won by Adam McAuley (Isle of Man, batting), Waqar Ali (Cyprus, bowling), Carl Hartmann (Isle of Man, fielding), Ali Masood (Estonia, most valuable player).

Squads

Cyprus named Michalis Kyriacou as captain of an initial squad of 22 players, which was reduced to 16 ahead of the matches.

Bilateral series

1st T20I

2nd T20I

Tri-nation series

Points table

Fixtures

References

External links
 Series home at ESPN Cricinfo (Estonia in Cyprus)
 Series home at ESPN Cricinfo (Cyprus T20I Cup)

Associate international cricket competitions in 2021–22